Douglas Hofsass (Doug Hofsass) is a former Assistant Administrator in the United States Department of Homeland Security, assigned to the Transportation Security Administration.  In addition to his role as the Assistant Administrator overseeing risk based security and trusted traveler programs, he also served as the Federal Security Director in New York City. As part of his responsibilities in New York City, he oversaw the first implementation of federal security operations under DHS at the Downtown Manhattan Heliport and the East 34th Street Heliport for commercial helicopter flights to John F Kennedy International Airport, Newark Liberty International Airport and LaGuardia Airport.  Hofsass also held the posts of General Manager of Commercial Aviation and Deputy Assistant Administrator for Policy and Industry Engagement for the Transportation Security Administration.  He was heavily involved in launching the TSA Pre-Check Program, and claimed a collaborative partnership with the US Customs Department and their Global Entry Program. Hofsass served at the Transportation Security Administration from 2002 until 2013, including several years working directly for Administrators John S. Pistole, Kip Hawley and Gale Rossides. Prior to his Federal executive service, Hofsass was with United Airlines management for nearly 10 years.  Hofsass returned to the commercial aviation sector in 2013.

References 

Living people
Aviation in the United States
Security
Year of birth missing (living people)